You Yong (born 13 December 1963) is a Chinese actor. He enrolled in the Xi'an Drama School (西安话剧院) in 1979 and joined the Shanghai Theatre Academy in 1984. Upon graduation in 1988, he acted in his first film, Obsession. He is best known for his roles as policemen or military officers.

Filmography

Film

Television

References

External links
 
 You Yong on chinesemov.com

Male actors from Shaanxi
Male actors from Xi'an
1963 births
Living people
Chinese male stage actors
20th-century Chinese male actors
21st-century Chinese male actors
Chinese male film actors
Chinese male television actors